Siana (also spelt as Siyana) is a village in the Jalore district of Rajasthan. It is located 36 km south east of  district headquarters Jalore town. Two important tourist destinations of Rajasthan Mount Abu and Jodhpur are 125 km and 180 km from Siana.

Demographics
As of 2001 India census, Siana had a population of 9,994. Males constitute 5,032 of the population and females 4,962.

References
Siyana
Siyana Population

Villages in Jalore district